José Martínez González (29 May 1953 – 14 February 1981) was a Mexican footballer.

Club career
"Pepe" Martínez played club football for Chivas de Guadalajara.

Death
He died in a traffic accident involving the Chivas team bus in Puebla at age 27. His jersey number 22 was retired by the club and is only used when mandatory in Copa Libertadores matches. Also is used in CONCACAF Champions games

References

1953 births
1981 deaths
Mexican footballers
C.D. Guadalajara footballers
CD Badajoz players
Road incident deaths in Mexico
Association football midfielders